Ypsolopha nigrofasciata is a moth of the family Ypsolophidae. It is known from China (Hebei) and the Russian Far East.

References

Moths described in 1977
Ypsolophidae
Moths of Asia